Harold Robert William Parfitt (1881 – 1 November 1976), was a founding member of The Boy Scouts, a pilot in the RFC (now known as  Royal Air Force) and a war correspondent during World War 1. He was also a Scottish trade representative and served as Chief Scout of the Boy-Scouts van België.

Biography
Parfitt was an organist in a Methodist church in Brussels, and created the first Scout group in Belgium, for British youth, at the end of 1908 or beginning of 1909, which interested several young people of Brussels. He then participated in the creation of the Boy-Scouts van België, trained the first members, and published the "Carnet du Boy-scout" translated and adapted from the Boy Scouts of America Scout Handbook in 1911.

In 1914, at the request of the government of the Ottoman Empire, he participated in the launch of Scouting in Turkey by founding the Izcilik Dernekleri. The organization was sponsored by the State organisation of the Ottoman Empire under the aegis of the Ministry of War, which saw it as a means of training young adolescents in military service. Membership was voluntary, and it was open to boys aged 11 to 17.

External links

References

Scouting and Guiding in Belgium
Scouting and Guiding in Turkey
Scouting pioneers
1881 births
Year of death missing
Chief Scouts